Qaleh-ye Fattahiyeh (also Romanized as Qal‘eh-ye Fattāḩīyeh and Qal‘eh Fattāḩīyeh; also known as Ghal‘eh Fattahiyeh, Qal‘eh-ye Fatāḩī, and Qal‘eh-ye Fattāḩī) is a village in Haram Rud-e Olya Rural District, in the Central District of Malayer County, Hamadan Province, Iran. At the 2006 census, its population was 376, in 82 families.

References 

Populated places in Malayer County